Christopher Tesdale (c.1592 – c.1655) was a member of the Westminster Assembly of Divines from 1643 to 1649 and a Canon of Chichester and Wells.

Early life and education
He was a born into the influential Tesdale family of Abingdon around c.1592. He was educated at John Roysse's Free School in Abingdon, (now Abingdon School). He later studied at New College, Oxford gaining a Master of Arts, on 19 June 1618 and then was a fellow of Pembroke College, Oxford.

Career
His was the pastor at Hurstbourne Tarrant and was a supporter of the parliament during the English Civil War. He became a member of the Westminster Assembly of Divines, from 1643 to 1649 and was a Canon of Chichester and Wells. He was the cousin of Thomas Tesdale and was tasked as valuer, witness and keeper of Thomas' will in addition to receiving. Christopher was given payments in the will for the remainder of his live.

His sermon 'Hierusalem: or A vision of peace' held at St Margaret's, Westminster, before the House of Commons on 28 August 1644 was published by Richard Cotes of London.

See also
 List of Old Abingdonians
 List of members of the Westminster Assembly

References

1592 births
1655 deaths
People educated at Abingdon School
Alumni of New College, Oxford
Alumni of Pembroke College, Oxford